The Leonberger is a dog breed, whose name derives from the city of Leonberg in Baden-Württemberg, Germany.

Description

Appearance
This breed occurs with a generous double coat; the Leonberger is a large, muscular, and elegant dog with balanced body type, medium temperament, and dramatic presence. The head is adorned with a striking black mask and projects the breed's distinct expression of intelligence, pride, and kindliness. Remaining true to their early roots as a capable family and working dog and search-and-rescue dog (particularly water), the surprisingly agile Leonberger is sound and coordinated, with both strength in bearing and elegance in movement. A sexually dimorphic breed, the Leonberger possesses either a strongly masculine or elegantly feminine form, making gender immediately discernible.

Size, proportion, and substance
Height at withers:

 Male: , average  
 Female: , average  

Weight:

 Males: , average 
 Females: , average 

Capable of demanding work, the Leonberger is a dog of ample substance. Its frame is supported with well-muscled, medium to heavy bone in direct proportion to its size. A roomy chest is sufficiently broad and deep for the purpose of work. Seen in profile, the chest curves inward from the prosternum, tangentially joins at the elbow to its underline at 50% of the withers' height, and then continues slightly upward toward the stifle.

Head
The head is well balanced in proportion to the size of the dog and is deeper than broad with the length of muzzle and the length of skull roughly equal. With close-fitting eyelids, the eyes are set into the skull upon a slight oblique; the eyes are medium-sized, almond-shaped, and colored dark brown. The ears are fleshy, moderately sized, and pendant-shaped, with sufficient substance to hang close to the skull and drop the tip of the ears level with the inside corners of the mouth. The Leonberger's ears rise from halfway between the eye and the top of the skull to level with the top of the skull. Though level bites and slight anomalies not affecting the robustness of the lower jaw are common, the ideal Leonberger  possesses a strong scissor bite with full dentition.

Coat

Both a necessity for work and a defining attribute of the breed, the Leonberger has a water-resistant double coat on the body that is complemented by the shorter, fine hair on the muzzle and limbs. The long, profuse, outer coat is durable, relatively straight, lies flat, and fits close. A mature, masculine Leonberger exhibits a pronounced mane. Similarly, his tail is very well furnished from the tip to the base where it blends harmoniously with the breech's furnishings. Climate permitting, his undercoat is soft and dense. Apart from a neatening of the feet, the Leonberger is presented untrimmed.

Colour 

Several coat colours are acceptable, including all combinations of lion-yellow, red, red-brown, and sand. Nose leather, foot pads, and lips should always be black. Faulty colours include brown with brown nose leather, black and tan, black, white, or silver, and eyes without any brown. A small patch of white on the chest or toes is permitted.

Temperament

First and foremost a family dog, the Leonberger's temperament is one of its most important and distinguishing characteristics. Well socialized and trained, the Leonberger is self-assured, insensitive to noise, submissive to family members, friendly toward children, well composed with passersby, and self-disciplined when obliging its family or property with protection. Robust, loyal, intelligent, playful, and kindly, they can thus be taken anywhere without difficulty and adjust easily to a variety of circumstances, including the introduction of other dogs. Proper control and early socialization and training are essential, as this is a giant breed.

Health
Leonbergers are strong, generally healthy dogs. Hip dysplasia, which devastates many large breeds, is largely controlled because of the effort of many breeders who actively screen their Leonbergers using X-rays evaluated by the Orthopedic Foundation for Animals and leave dysplastic specimens out of the gene pool, thereby reducing the risk of bone/joint problems. For over 20 years, breeders belonging to the Leonberger Club of America, which issued pedigrees for the Leonberger breed in America, adhered to many aspects of the German breeding program, whereby member kennels may only choose to breed dogs that were certified as having three generations free of hip dysplasia. As a likely result, the incidence of hip dysplasia in the breed was reduced to almost 10% and the occurrence of OFA-rated "Excellent" hips increased by over 60% in just 20 years. Current incidence rates of hip dysplasia in Leonbergers are likely around 13%. After 2010, when the Leonberger Club of America joined the American Kennel Club, the formerly strict breeding rules are no longer mandatory for all Leonbergers.

Though not common, Leonbergers do inherit and/or develop a number of diseases that range in their impact from mild to devastating. In addition to hip dysplasia, Leonbergers can inherit and/or develop heart problems, inherited Leonberger paralysis/polyneuropathy, osteosarcoma, hemangiosarcoma, osteochondrosis dissecans, allergies, digestive disorders, cataracts, entropion/ectropion eyelids, progressive retinal atrophy, perianal fistulas, and thyroid disorders. Though rumors persist of Leonbergers being more sensitive to anesthesia than other dog breeds, they are largely untrue. Leonbergers, like other large-breed dogs, require less dosage per pound of sedative than smaller breeds to yield the same effect. The Leonberger Health Foundation, a private nonprofit foundation whose sole mission is to support major researchers who are seeking to identify genetic markers for serious diseases that affect the breed, is currently focusing on osteosarcoma, hemangiosarcoma, and Leonberger polyneuropathy.

Longevity
Leonbergers in U.K. and U.S./Canada surveys had a median lifespan around 7 years, which is about 4 years less than the average purebred dog, but typical of similarly sized breeds. About 20% of Leonbergers in the surveys lived to 10 years or more. The oldest dogs in both surveys died at about 13. In France, the breed has a median lifespan of 8.75 years.

Serious diseases can affect the Leonberger—certain types of cancers are very common in the breed. Gastric dilatation volvulus, commonly called bloat, is another serious condition that affects many of the large- and giant-breed dogs, particularly those with deep chests. It causes the stomach to twist and can be fatal quite quickly. Adult Leonbergers should always be fed twice a day rather than one large meal to reduce the likelihood of bloat. Leonbergers are not alone in inheriting serious diseases, and according to the University of Sydney's LIDA taskforce, Leonbergers have relatively few health issues compared to other dog breeds.

In a 2004 U.K. Kennel Club survey, the most common causes of death were cancer (45%), cardiac disease (11%), and "unknown" (8.5%). In a 2000 U.S./Canada Leonberger Club of America survey, the most common causes of death were cancer (37%), old age (12%), cardiac disease (9%), and "sudden death" (8%).

Studies have indicated problems with inherited polyneuropathy in certain populations of Leonbergers and cataracts in dogs in the United Kingdom. A study of "Leonberger polyneuropathy" was published in 2014. Genetic testing is to be done through a protocol administered in North America by the University of Minnesota Veterinary Diagnostic Laboratory or Institute of Genetics, Vetsuisse Faculty, University of Bern, Bern, Switzerland.

History

In the 1830s, Heinrich Essig, a dog breeder and seller and mayor of the town of Leonberg near Stuttgart in Baden-Württemberg, Germany, claimed to have created the Leonberger by crossing a female Landseer Newfoundland with a "barry" male from the Great St Bernard Hospice and Monastery (which would later create the Saint Bernard).  Later, according to Essig, a Pyrenean Mountain Dog was added, resulting in very large dogs with the long, white coats that were the fashion for the time, and a pleasant temperament. The first dogs registered as Leonbergers were born in 1846 and had many of the prized qualities of the breeds from which they were derived. The legend is that the dogs were bred to be an homage of the lion in the town crest and coat-of-arms animal of Leonberg, the lion. The Leonberger dog became popular with several European royal households, including Napoleon II, Empress Elisabeth of Austria, the Prince of Wales, Otto Von Bismarck, Emperor Napoleon III, and Umberto I of Italy. Essig's claim of breeding the dog as described is disputed. Records from as early as 1585 may indicate the existence of Leonberger-type dogs; documents dating from 1601 held by the Metternich family describe similar dogs used to deter the theft of livestock.  Either way,  no doubt exists that Essig named and registered the breed first. A black-and-white engraving of the Leonberger was included in The Illustrated Book of the Dog by Vero Shaw (at p. 488) in 1881.  At the time, Essig's Leonbergers were denounced as an indifferent knockoff of a St. Bernard—not a stable and recognized breed—and a product of a popular fad or fashion for large and strong dogs, fomented in part by Essig's prodigious marketing skills (he gave dogs to the rich and famous).

The modern look of the Leonberger, with darker coats and black masks, was developed during the latter part of the 20th century by reintroducing other breeds, such as the Newfoundland. This was necessary because breeding stocks of the Leonberger were seriously affected by the two world wars. During World War I, reportedly, only five Leonbergers survived World War I and were bred until World War II when, again, almost all Leonbergers were lost. During the two world wars, Leonbergers were used to pull the ammunition carts, a service to the breed's country that resulted in the Leonbergers' near-destruction. Karl Stadelmann and Otto Josenhans are credited as the breed's saviors, bringing them back from almost extinction. Leonbergers today can have their ancestry traced to the eight dogs that survived World War II.

Traditionally, Leonbergers were kept as farm dogs and were much praised for their abilities in watchdog and draft work. They were frequently seen pulling carts around the villages of Bavaria and surrounding districts. Around the beginning of the 20th century, Leonbergers were imported by the government of Canada for use as water rescue/lifesaving dogs. The breed continues in that role today, along with the Newfoundland, Labrador Retriever, and Golden Retriever; they are used at the Italian School of Canine Lifeguard.  They have been used successfully as flock guard dogs.

The Leonberger received American Kennel Club recognition as a member of the Working Group on January 1, 2010, alongside the Icelandic Sheepdog and the Cane Corso. It was the 167th breed to be recognized by the AKC.

In popular culture
The Lifetime TV movie Grumpy Cat's Worst Christmas Ever features a Leonberger that becomes a victim of a dognapping, co-starring with the famous Grumpy Cat.

In the story Murphy and the Great Surf Rescue in Gill Lewis' Puppy Academy series of children's books, Murphy is a Leonberger puppy whose special skill is swimming.

The graphic music video "Deutschland" by German rock band Rammstein portrays the symbolic figure of Germania giving birth to Leonberger puppies.

Leonberger dogs are represented in many stamps from around the world.

See also
 Dogs portal
 List of dog breeds

References

Further reading
 
 
 
 
 
 
 
  
 
 Pfaumer, Sharon. (July 1996) "The Leonberger, the golden-hearted lion dog." in Dog World (USA), pp. 14–22.
 
 
 at Internet Archive
 Stramer, Metha. The Dog of Leonberg: The History of a Dog Breed . Multilingual (English, German, French, Dutch) trilogy on the history of the Leonberger dog (1846-1948) (Independent Leo Gazette) .

External links

 World Wide Independent Database Foundationhttp://leonberger-database.com/index.html

 Other resources at Leonberger Union
 
 

Dog breeds originating in Germany
FCI breeds
Lifesaving
Livestock guardian dogs